This is a list of major infrastructure on the Northeast Corridor, a rail line running through the northeast United States. The list includes major interlockings, bridges, tunnels, and past and present stations, including MBTA Orange Line, WMATA Orange Line, and PATH stations on separate tracks but sharing the right-of-way. It is intended as a companion to the list of stations in the main article.

Amtrak lines: AE=Acela Express, AD=Adirondack, CD=Cardinal, CL=Carolinian, CPL=Capitol Limited, CS=Crescent, EAE=Ethan Allen Express, ES=Empire Service, KS=Keystone, LS=Lake Shore Limited, ML=Maple Leaf, NR=Northeast Regional, PA=Pennsylvanian, PL=Palmetto, SM=Silver Meteor, SS=Silver Star, VT=Vermonter (note that not all trains of that designation necessarily stop at all marked stations)
MARC: Served by MARC Penn Line trains.
MBTA: Served by MBTA Providence/Stoughton Line, Franklin Line, Needham Line, Fairmount Line, and / or Framingham/Worcester Line trains.
MNR: Served by MTA Metro-North Railroad New Haven Line, Danbury Branch, New Canaan Branch, and / or Waterbury Branch trains.
NJT: Served by New Jersey Transit Atlantic City Line, Montclair-Boonton Line, Morristown Line, Gladstone Branch, North Jersey Coast Line, and Northeast Corridor Line
LIRR: Served by Long Island Rail Road City Terminal Zone portion of Main Line trains to Penn Station.
PATH: Served by Newark – World Trade Center trains.
SEPTA: Served by SEPTA Regional Rail Airport Line, Wilmington/Newark Line, Media/Wawa Line, Trenton Line, and / or Chestnut Hill West Line trains.
SLE: Served by Shore Line East trains.

North to South

References

See also
 North–South Rail Link (proposed)

Northeast Corridor
United States railway-related lists